is a female field hockey field player from Japan, who is playing for Sony Bravia Ladies. She plays as a defender and is the striker of the penalty corner in her league team as well as the national team. She can strike the ball up to 120 km/h.

She was the team captain of the women's national team that participated in the 2004 Summer Olympics in Athens, Greece as well as a member of the team of the women's national team that participated in the 2008 Summer Olympics in Beijing, China.

External links
 Profile at Sankei Sports 
 
 Japan Olympics Committee 
 Sony Bravia Ladies 
 

1975 births
Living people
Japanese female field hockey players
Olympic field hockey players of Japan
Field hockey players at the 2004 Summer Olympics
Field hockey players at the 2008 Summer Olympics
People from Gifu
Asian Games medalists in field hockey
Field hockey players at the 2002 Asian Games
Field hockey players at the 2006 Asian Games
Field hockey players at the 2010 Asian Games
Asian Games silver medalists for Japan
Asian Games bronze medalists for Japan
Medalists at the 2002 Asian Games
Medalists at the 2006 Asian Games
Medalists at the 2010 Asian Games
21st-century Japanese women